The Liberal Party of Sweden was a political party in Sweden. It was formed in 1923 by the anti-prohibition minority of the Free-minded National Association as a consequence of the split over the issue on alcohol prohibition.

In 1934 the two parties reunited in the form of the People's Party.

Leaders
 Eliel Löfgren, 1923–1930
 Ernst Lyberg, 1930–1933
 Karl Andreas Andersson, 1933–1934

See also
Liberalism and centrism in Sweden

References

Political parties established in 1923
Defunct political parties in Sweden
Defunct liberal political parties
Liberals (Sweden)
Political parties disestablished in 1934
1923 establishments in Sweden
1934 disestablishments in Sweden